is a lake in the Kiso Mountains, in the central region of Nagano Prefecture, Japan.

Geography
The lake is the source of the Tenryū River. It ranks 24th in lake water surface area in Japan. The cities of Suwa and Okaya and the town of Shimosuwa are located on the shores of Lake Suwa.

Omiwatari

Local Shinto tradition holds that the ridges are formed by the gods crossing the lake when traveling between the various buildings of the Suwa Grand Shrine. Folklore says it is the guardian god of Suwa, Takeminakata-no-kami, leaving his sanctuary to meet with his wife, the goddess , joining the opposite bank by walking on frozen water. The record of this crossing is the oldest-known human-observed climate record. This record has been used by scientists to study the impact of sunspots, human development and anthropogenic CO2 emissions on lake ice formation.

The lake has a natural hot spring under its surface. Recreational development in the 1950s resulted in increased output from this underwater geyser. Since 1945, complete ice cover is considered to be achieved when the entire surface is frozen except for the opening in the ice for the geyser.

As a shallow lake, Lake Suwa is highly sensitive to climatic variation. Recent studies have shown that Suwa's ice-free years correlate to increasing atmospheric CO2 levels. Research on ice breakup at Suwa and at the mouth of the Torne River in Finland suggest that climate change is driving the changes in seasonal ice cover. As a result, it is expected that Lake Suwa will remain ice-free for almost the entirety of the 21st century's winters.

Cultural history
Lake Suwa hosts two major shrines, the Tenaga Jinja and the Suwa Jinja. Major festivals include the Onbashira and Setsubun.

Hokusai included Lake Suwa in his famous Thirty-six Views of Mount Fuji (Fugaku sanjūrokkei) series of woodblock prints.

Epson, a global technology company, was founded and is headquartered in Suwa.

In popular culture

In the movie Kagemusha by Akira Kurosawa, the corpse of Lord Shingen is dropped into the lake. This film dramatizes the events leading up to the 1575 Battle of Nagashino.

Sayo Masuda, author of Autobiography of a Geisha, was sold by her family to an okiya (geisha house) in Suwa at the age of 12. She tries to drown herself in the lake, but hesitates because she believes a dragon (possibly related to the omiwatari) inhabits it.

In the anime Rurouni Kenshin, legend holds of an "Elixir of Immortality" that can be found somewhere in or around Lake Suwa. The main characters search for the elixir in the final season of the series and are followed by a band of evil German knights, seeking it for world domination.
The anime Blood-C takes place in a rural town located on the shore of the lake.
Suwako Moriya from the Touhou Project is named after the lake.
This lake is also popular because from the movie of Your Name as it gained its tourist visitors. The Itomori town where Mitsuha (Main Female Protagonist) lived was modeled after the Lake Suwa in Gifu.

See also
 Onbashira
 List of lakes in Japan

References

Suwa
Landforms of Nagano Prefecture
Kiso Mountains